Xinxiang Hygiene School is a sanitation college in the Chinese city of Xinxiang.

Universities and colleges in Henan
Xinxiang
Water supply and sanitation in China